Pseudochromis flavivertex, the sunrise dottyback, is a species of ray-finned fish from the Western Indian Ocean which is a member of the family Pseudochromidae. It occasionally makes its way into the aquarium trade. It grows to a size of 7.2 -7.5 cm in length as male, and 6.5 cm as a female. It eats various benthic worms and crustaceans.

References

flavivertex
Fish described in 1835